John Shand  (22 January 1834 – 30 November 1914) was a New Zealand university professor, educationalist and administrator. He was one of the three foundation professors at the University of Otago.

Early life
Shand was born in Elgin, Morayshire, Scotland, in 1834. He was educated at Elgin Academy and the University of Aberdeen, from which he graduated as a Master of Arts in 1854. He held the position of mathematical master for nine years at the Ayr Academy and then a similar position at the Edinburgh Academy. On 8 February 1871, he married Annie Bell at Glasgow.

Academic career
In 1870, Shand was appointed in to the Chair of Mathematics and Natural Philosophy at the University of Otago, and he travelled to New Zealand on the ship Wild Deer in 1871, becoming one of the first three professors at that university. The dual professorship was divided in 1876, and he opted to retain the Chair of Natural Philosophy, which he kept till his retirement in October 1913. He was a member of the New Zealand Institute and of the Australasian Association for the Advancement of Science. In 1877 he served on the Royal Commission to enquire into the operation of the University of New Zealand.

He became a member of the Senate in 1877.  He sat on the Otago Education Board from 1876 to 1896, and was chairman from 1882 to 1885. He served on the High Schools Board of Governors from 1878 to 1890 and 1898 to 1904. In 1889 the honorary degree of LL.D. was conferred upon him. Following his retirement from Otago in 1913, Shand was appointed a Companion of the Order of St Michael and St George in the 1914 New Year Honours.

Shand died on 30 November 1914 at Dunedin, about a year after his retirement, and he was buried at the Dunedin Northern Cemetery.

References

1834 births
1914 deaths
Academic staff of the University of Otago
New Zealand schoolteachers
Scottish emigrants to New Zealand
New Zealand Companions of the Order of St Michael and St George
Natural philosophers
Scottish mathematicians
People educated at Elgin Academy, Moray
Alumni of the University of Aberdeen
Burials at Dunedin Northern Cemetery